is a junction railway station in the city of Shibukawa, Gunma, Japan, operated by the East Japan Railway Company (JR East).

Lines
It is also a freight depot for the Japan Freight Railway Company (JR Freight).

Station layout
The station has a single side platform and a single island platform connected to the station building by an underground passage. The station has a Midori no Madoguchi ticket office.

From the bus terminal, local buses leave bound for Takasaki Station, Maebashi Station, Ikaho, Nakanojō Station, Numata direction, and other destinations. Long-distance buses leave for Tokyo, Osaka, and other destinations. A taxi stand is by the main entrance.

In the center of the sidewalk portion of the rotary is a large map of Japan; there is a sculpture in the center of the map, highlighting Shibukawa's claim to be the geographical center of Japan.

Platforms

History
Shibukawa Station opened on 1 July 1921. Upon the privatization of the Japanese National Railways (JNR) on 1 April 1987, it came under the control of JR East.

Passenger statistics
In fiscal 2019, the station was used by an average of 3263 passengers daily (boarding passengers only). The passenger figures for previous years are as shown below.

Surrounding area
Shibukawa Shopping Plaza
Shibukawa Post Office

See also
 List of railway stations in Japan

References

External links

  

Railway stations in Gunma Prefecture
Railway stations in Japan opened in 1921
Stations of East Japan Railway Company
Jōetsu Line
Agatsuma Line
Shibukawa, Gunma
Stations of Japan Freight Railway Company